Satulung (Hungarian: Kővárhosszúfalu; German: Langendorf) is a commune in Maramureș County, Romania. Its name, translated in English, means "the long village". It is composed of seven villages: Arieșu de Pădure (Erdőaranyos), Fersig (Fehérszék), Finteușu Mic (Kisfentős), Hideaga (Pusztahidegkút), Mogoșești (Magosfalu), Pribilești (Pribékfalva) and Satulung.

Demographics
According to the census conducted in 2011, the population of the Satulung is of 5837 inhabitants, more than at the previous census in 2002, when 5,409 inhabitants were registered. The majority were ethnic Romanian (75.07%). The main minority are the Roma people (19.86%) and the Hungarians (1.59%). For 3.41% of the population, ethnicity is not known.

People
 Blanka Teleki, who founded a school, was born here in 1806.

References

Communes in Maramureș County